Booze is a surname. Notable people with the surname include:

Bea Booze (1920–1986), American jazz singer
Mary Booze (1877–1948), African-American politician
Tyrone Booze (born 1959), American boxer
William Samuel Booze (1862–1933), late 19th-century American politician

See Also
Booz (surname)

English-language surnames